HMS Venerable (R63) was a  of the Royal Navy. She served for only the last few months of World War II, and in 1948 she was sold to the Netherlands and renamed , taking part in the military clash in 1962 in Western New Guinea. Subsequently, she was sold to Argentina and renamed , later taking part in the Falklands War.

Construction and career
HMS Venerable was laid down at Cammell Laird in Birkenhead on 3 December 1942 and launched just over a year later. The ship was commissioned on 17 January 1945. As with others of the class completed just before the ending of hostilities, HMS Venerable immediately headed to the Far East to join the 11th Aircraft Carrier Squadron (Colossus,  and ) of the British Pacific Fleet. Each carrier had around 40 F4U Corsair fighters and Fairey Barracuda torpedo bombers on board.

After the end of hostilities, HMS Venerable repatriated prisoners of war to Canada and Australia, before returning to the UK. Venerable only served three years in the Royal Navy before being sold to the Dutch as HNLMS Karel Doorman. In 1968, after a boiler-room fire, she was sold to the Argentine Navy and renamed ARA Veinticinco de Mayo.

By 1990, she was inoperable, and she subsequently provided spare parts for her sister ship, which had been sold to the Brazilian Navy. The remaining part of the ship was scrapped in Alang, India, in 1999 or 2000.

References

External links

 Maritimequest HMS Venerable photo gallery
 Karel Doorman, Netherlands Carrier
 Naval-History.net HMS Venerable

 

Colossus-class aircraft carriers
Ships built on the River Mersey
1943 ships
World War II aircraft carriers of the United Kingdom